Old School Baptist Church of Halcottsville is a historic Baptist church building on Old NY 30 in Halcottsville, Delaware County, New York. It is a one-story, wood-frame building constructed in 1886 by Eld. Isaac Hewitt as a branch of the Second Old School Baptist Church of Roxbury.  The interior features a traditional meeting house plan.

It was added to the National Register of Historic Places in 1999.

See also
Olive and Hurley Old School Baptist Church
Second Old School Baptist Church of Roxbury
First Old School Baptist Church of Roxbury
National Register of Historic Places listings in Delaware County, New York

References

Baptist churches in New York (state)
Churches on the National Register of Historic Places in New York (state)
National Register of Historic Places in Delaware County, New York
Churches completed in 1886
19th-century Baptist churches in the United States
Churches in Delaware County, New York
1886 establishments in New York (state)